This is a list of law enforcement agencies in the state of Montana.

According to the US Bureau of Justice Statistics' 2008 Census of State and Local Law Enforcement Agencies, the state had 119 law enforcement agencies employing 3,229 sworn police officers, about 201 for each 100,000 residents.

State agencies

Montana Department of Corrections
Montana Department of Justice
Montana Highway Patrol
Division of Criminal Investigations
Gambling Control Division
Investigation Bureau
Montana Department of Livestock
Brands Enforcement Division
Montana Department of Fish, Wildlife, and Parks
Law Enforcement Bureau
Montana Department of Transportation
Motor Carrier Services
Enforcement Bureau

County agencies

Beaverhead County Sheriff's Office
Big Horn County Sheriff's Office
Blaine County Sheriff's Office
Broadwater County Sheriff's Office
Carbon County Sheriff's Office
Carter County Sheriff's Office
Cascade County Sheriff's Office
Chouteau County Sheriff's Office
Custer County Sheriff's Office
Daniels County Sheriff's Office
Dawson County Sheriff's Office
Fallon County Sheriff's Office
Fergus County Sheriff's Office
Flathead County Sheriff's Office
Gallatin County Sheriff's Office
Garfield County Sheriff's Office
Glacier County Sheriff's Office
Golden Valley County Sheriff's Office

Granite County Sheriff's Office
Hill County Sheriff's Office
Jefferson County Sheriff's Office
Judith Basin County Sheriff's Office
Lake County Sheriff's Office
Lewis and Clark County Sheriff's Office
Liberty County Sheriff's Office
Lincoln County Sheriff's Office
Madison County Sheriff's Office
McCone County Sheriff's Office
Meagher County Sheriff's Office
Mineral County Sheriff's Office
Missoula County Sheriff's Office
Musselshell County Sheriff's Office
Park County Sheriff's Office
Petroleum County Sheriff's Office
Phillips County Sheriff's Office
Pondera County Sheriff's Office

Powder River County Sheriff's Office
Powell County Sheriff's Office
Prairie County Sheriff's Office
Ravalli County Sheriff's Office
Richland County Sheriff's Office
Roosevelt County Sheriff's Office
Rosebud County Sheriff's Office
Sanders County Sheriff's Office
Sheridan County Sheriff's Office
Stillwater County Sheriff's Office
Sweet Grass County Sheriff's Office
Teton County Sheriff's Office
Toole County Sheriff's Office
Treasure County Sheriff's Office
Valley Treasure County Sheriff's Office
Wheatland County Sheriff's Office
Wibaux County Sheriff's Office
Yellowstone County Sheriff's Office

Combined city and county agencies

Anaconda-Deer Lodge County Law Enforcement Department

Butte-Silver Bow Law Enforcement Department

City agencies

Baker Police Department
Belgrade Police Department
Billings Police Department
Boulder Police Department
Bozeman Police Department
Bridger Police Department
Chinook Police Department
Colstrip Police Department
Columbia Falls Police Department
Columbus Police Department
Conrad Police Department
Cut Bank Police Department
Darby Police Department

Deer Lodge Police Department
Dillon Police Department
East Helena Police Department
Ennis Police Department
Eureka Police Department
Fairview Police Department
Fort Benton Police Department
Glasgow Police Department
Glendive Police Department
Great Falls Police Department
Hamilton Police Department
Hardin Police Department

Havre Police Department
Helena Police Department
Hot Springs Police Department
Kalispell Police Department
Laurel Police Department
Lewistown Police Department
Libby Police Department
Livingston Police Department
Manhattan Police Department
Miles City Police Department
Missoula Police Department
Plains Police Department

Polson Police Department
Red Lodge Police Department
Ronan Police Department
St. Ignatius Police Department
Sheridan Police Department
Sidney Police Department
Stevensville Police Department
Thompson Falls Police Department
Troy Police Department
West Yellowstone Police Department
Whitefish Police Department
Wolf Point Police Department

Tribal agencies

Blackfeet Law Enforcement Services
Blackfeet Nation Fish & Wildlife
Chippewa Cree Law Enforcement Services
Chippewa Cree Tribes Fish & Game
Crow Police Department
Crow Tribe Fish & Game

Confederated Salish and Kootenai Tribal Fish & Game
Confederated Salish and Kootenai Tribal Police Department
Fort Belknap Law Enforcement Services
Fort Belknap Fish & Wildlife Department
Fort Peck Department of Law and Justice
Fort Peck Fish and Wildlife Department

College and university agencies

Montana State University Police Department
Montana State University Billings Police Department
University of Montana Police Department

Airport agencies

Bert Mooney Airport Authority Police
Gallatin Airport Authority Department of Public Safety
Great Falls International Airport Authority Police Department
Billings Logan International Airport Police Department
Missoula County Airport Authority Public Safety Department

References

Montana Law Enforcement Personnel, Montana Board of Crime Control

Montana
Law enforcement agencies